Sámi languages, in English also rendered as Sami and Saami, are a group of Uralic languages spoken by the Sámi people in Northern Europe (in parts of northern Finland, Norway, Sweden, and extreme northwestern Russia). There are, depending on the nature and terms of division, ten or more Sami languages. Several spellings have been used for the Sámi languages, including Sámi, Sami, Saami, Saame, Sámic, Samic and Saamic, as well as the exonyms Lappish and Lappic. The last two, along with the term Lapp, are now often considered pejorative.

Classification 
The Sámi languages form a branch of the Uralic language family. According to the traditional view, Sámi is within the Uralic family most closely related to the Finnic languages (Sammallahti 1998). However, this view has recently been doubted by some scholars who argue that the traditional view of a common Finno-Sami protolanguage is not as strongly supported as had been earlier assumed, and that the similarities may stem from an areal influence on Samic from Finnic.

In terms of internal relationships, the Sami languages are divided into the two groups of western and eastern. The groups may be further divided into various subgroups and ultimately individual languages. (Sammallahti 1998: 6-38.) Parts of the Sami language area form a dialect continuum in which the neighbouring languages may be mutually intelligible to a fair degree, but two more widely separated groups will not understand each other's speech. There are, however, some sharp language boundaries, in particular between Northern Sami, Inari Sami and Skolt Sami, the speakers of which are not able to understand each other without learning or long practice. The evolution of sharp language boundaries seems to suggest a relative isolation of the language speakers from each other and not very intensive contacts between the respective speakers in the past. There is some significance in this, as the geographical barriers between the respective speakers are no different from those in other parts of the Sami area.

Western Sami languages 
 Southwestern
 Southern Sami (600 speakers)
 Åsele dialect
 Jämtland dialect
 Ume Sami (20 speakers)
 Northwestern
 Northwestern proper
 Pite Sami (20)
 Lule Sami (1,000–2,000 speakers)
 Northern Sami ( speakers)
 Torne Sami
 Finnmark Sami
 Sea Sami

Eastern Sami languages 

 Mainland
Inari Sami (300 speakers)
 Kemi Sami (extinct)
 Skolt Sami (320 speakers)
 Akkala Sami (extinct)
 Kainuu Sami (extinct)
Peninsular
 Kildin Sami (600 speakers)
 Ter Sami (2 speakers)

The above figures are approximate.

Geographic distribution 
The Sami languages are spoken in Sápmi in Northern Europe, in a region stretching over the four countries Norway, Sweden, Finland and Russia, reaching from the southern part of central Scandinavia in the southwest to the tip of the Kola Peninsula in the east. The borders between the languages do not align with the ones separating the region's modern states.

During the Middle Ages and early modern period, now-extinct Sami languages were also spoken in the central and southern parts of Finland and Karelia and in a wider area on the Scandinavian Peninsula. Historical documents as well as Finnish and Karelian oral tradition contain many mentions of the earlier Sami inhabitation in these areas (Itkonen, 1947). Also, loanwords as well as place-names of Sami origin in the southern dialects of Finnish and Karelian dialects testify of earlier Sami presence in the area (Koponen, 1996; Saarikivi, 2004; Aikio, 2007). These Sami languages, however, became extinct later, under the wave of the Finno-Karelian agricultural expansion.

History 
The Proto-Samic language is believed to have formed in the vicinity of the Gulf of Finland between 1000 BC to 700 AD, deriving from a common Proto-Sami-Finnic language (M. Korhonen 1981). However, reconstruction of any basic proto-languages in the Uralic family have reached a level close to or identical to Proto-Uralic (Salminen 1999). According to the comparative linguist Ante Aikio, the Proto-Samic language developed in South Finland or in Karelia around 2000–2500 years ago, spreading then to northern Fennoscandia. The language is believed to have expanded west and north into Fennoscandia during the Nordic Iron Age, reaching central Scandinavia during the Proto-Scandinavian period ca. 500 AD (Bergsland 1996). The language assimilated several layers of unknown Paleo-European languages from the early hunter-gatherers, first during the Proto-Sami phase and second in the subsequent expansion of the language in the west and the north of Fennoscandia that is part of modern Sami today. (Aikio 2004, Aikio 2006).

Written languages and sociolinguistic situation 
At present there are nine living Sami languages. Eight of the languages have independent literary languages; the other one has no written standard, and of it, there are only a few, mainly elderly, speakers left. The ISO 639-2 code for all Sami languages without their own code is "smi". The eight written languages are:

 Northern Sami (Norway, Sweden, Finland): With an estimated 15,000 speakers, this accounts for probably more than 75% of all Sami speakers in 2002. ISO 639-1/ISO 639-2:  se/sme
 Lule Sami (Norway, Sweden): The second largest group with an estimated 1,500 speakers. ISO 639-2:  smj
 Ume Sami (Norway, Sweden): likely has under 20 speakers left. ISO 639-2: smu
 Pite Sami has about 30–50 speakers, ISO 639-2:  sje
 Southern Sami (Norway, Sweden): 500 speakers (estimated). ISO 639-2:  sma
 Inari Sami (Enare Sami) (Inari, Finland): 500 speakers (estimated). SIL code:  LPI, ISO 639-2:  smn
 Skolt Sami (Näätämö and the Nellim-Keväjärvi districts, Inari municipality, Finland, also spoken in Russia, previously in Norway): 400 speakers (estimated). SIL code:  LPK, ISO 639-2: sms
 Kildin Sami (Kola Peninsula, Russia): 608 speakers in Murmansk Oblast, 179 in other Russian regions, although 1991 persons stated their Saami ethnicity (1769 of them live in Murmansk Oblast) SIL code:  LPD, ISO 639-3: sjd

The other Sami languages are critically endangered (moribund, have very few speakers left) or extinct. Ten speakers of Ter Sami were known to be alive in 2004. The last speaker of Akkala Sami is known to have died in December 2003, and the eleventh attested variety, Kemi Sami, became extinct in the 19th century. An additional Sami language, Kainuu Sami, became extinct in the 18th century, and probably belonged to the Eastern group like Kemi Sami, although the evidence for the language is limited.

Orthographies 

Most Sámi languages use Latin alphabets, with these respective additional letters.

{|
|Northern Sámi: || Áá Čč Đđ Ŋŋ Šš Ŧŧ Žž
|-
|Inari Sámi: || Áá Ââ Ää Čč Đđ Ŋŋ Šš Žž
|-
|Skolt Sámi: || Ââ Čč Ʒʒ Ǯǯ Đđ Ǧǧ Ǥǥ Ǩǩ Ŋŋ      Õõ  Šš Žž  Åå Ää (soft sign ʹ and a separator ʼ)
|-
|Lule Sámi (Sweden): || Áá Åå Ŋŋ Ää
|-
|Lule Sámi (Norway): || Áá Åå Ŋŋ Ææ
|-
|Southern Sámi (Sweden): ||  Ïï Ää Öö Åå
|-
|Southern Sámi (Norway): ||  Ïï Ææ Øø Åå
|-
|Ume Sámi: || Áá Đđ Ïï Ŋŋ Ŧŧ Üü Åå Ää Öö
|-
|Pite Sámi: || Áá Đđ Ŋŋ Ŧŧ Åå Ää
|}

The use of Ææ in Norway vs. Ää in Sweden merely reflects the orthographic standards used in the Norwegian and Swedish alphabets, respectively, not differences in pronunciations.

The letter Đ in Sámi languages is a capital D with a bar across it (Unicode code point: U+0110), which is also used in Serbo-Croatian, Vietnamese, etc., not the near-identical capital eth (Ð; U+00D0) used in Icelandic, Faroese or Old English.

The capital letter Ŋ (eng) is commonly presented in Sámi languages using the "N-form" variant based the usual Latin uppercase N with a hook added. Unicode assigns code point U+014A to the uppercase eng, but does not proscribe the form of the glyph.

The Skolt Sámi standard uses ʹ (U+02B9) as a soft sign, but other apostrophes, such as ' (U+0027), ˊ (U+02CA) or ´ (U+00B4), are also sometimes used in published texts.

The Kildin Sámi orthography uses the Russian Cyrillic script with these additional letters: А̄а̄ Ӓӓ Е̄е̄ Ё̄ё̄ Һһ/ʼ Ӣӣ Јј/Ҋҋ Ӆӆ Ӎӎ Ӊӊ Ӈӈ О̄о̄ Ҏҏ Ӯӯ Ҍҍ Э̄э̄ Ӭӭ Ю̄ю̄ Я̄я̄

Official status

Norway 

Adopted in April 1988, Article 110a of the Norwegian Constitution states: "It is the responsibility of the authorities of the State to create conditions enabling the Sami people to preserve and develop its language, culture and way of life". The Sami Language Act went into effect in the 1990s. Sámi is an official language alongside Norwegian in the "administrative area for Sámi language", that includes eight municipalities in the northern half of Norway, namely Kautokeino, Karasjok, Gáivuotna – Kåfjord – Kaivuono, Nesseby, Porsanger, Tana, Tysfjord, Lavangen and Snåsa. In 2005 Sámi, Kven, Romanes and Romani were recognised as "regional or minority languages" in Norway within the framework of the European Charter for Regional or Minority Languages.

Sweden 

On 1 April 2000, Sami became one of five recognized minority languages in Sweden. It can be used in dealing with public authorities in the municipalities of Arjeplog, Gällivare, Jokkmokk, and Kiruna. In 2011, this list was enlarged considerably. In Sweden the University of Umeå teaches North, Ume and South Sami, and Uppsala University has courses in North, Lule and South Sami.

Finland 

In Finland, the Sami language act of 1991 granted the Northern, Inari, and Skolt Sami the right to use their languages for all government services. The Sami Language Act of 2003 made Sami an official language in Enontekiö, Inari, Sodankylä and Utsjoki municipalities. Some documents, such as specific legislation, are translated into these Sami languages, but knowledge of any of these Sami languages among officials is not common. As the major language in the region is Finnish, Sami speakers are essentially always bilingual with Finnish. Language nest daycares have been set up for teaching the languages to children. In education, Northern Sami, and to a more limited degree, Inari and Skolt Sami, can be studied at primary and secondary levels, both as a mothertongue (for native speakers) and as a foreign language (for non-native speakers).

Russia 
In Russia, Sámi has no official status, neither on the national, regional or local level. It is included in the list of indigenous minority languages. (Kildin) Sami has been taught at the Murmansk State Technical University since 2012; before then, it was taught at the Institute of the Peoples of the North in Saint Petersburg.

See also 
 Sami parliaments of Finland, Norway, and Sweden
 Norwegianization
 Pre-Finno-Ugric substrate

References

Sources

 Fernandez, J. 1997. Parlons lapon. – Paris.
 Itkonen, T. I. 1947. Lapparnas förekomst i Finland. – Ymer: 43–57. Stockholm.
 Koponen, Eino 1996. Lappische Lehnwörter im Finnischen und Karelischen. – Lars Gunnar Larsson (ed.), Lapponica et Uralica. 100 Jahre finnisch-ugrischer Unterricht an der Universität Uppsala. Studia Uralica Uppsaliensia 26: 83–98.
 Saarikivi, Janne 2004. Über das saamische Substratnamengut in Nordrußland und Finnland. – Finnisch-ugrische Forschungen 58: 162–234. Helsinki: Société Finno-Ougrienne.
 
 Wilbur, Joshua. 2014. A grammar of Pite Saami. Berlin: Language Science Press. (Open access)

External links 

 Ođđasat TV Channel in Sami languages
 On line radio stream in various sami languages
 Introduction to the history and current state of Sami
 Kimberli Mäkäräinen "Sámi-related odds and ends," including 5000+ word vocabulary list
 Risten Sámi dictionary and terminology database.
 Giellatekno Morphological and syntactic analysers and lexical resources for several Sami languages
 Divvun Proofing tools for some of the Sami languages
 Sámedikki giellastivra – Sami language department of the Norwegian Sami parliament (in Norwegian and Northern Sami)
 Finland – Sámi Language Act
 Sami Language Resources All about Sami Languages with glossaries, scholarly articles, resources
 Álgu database, an etymological database of the Sami languages (in Finnish and North Sámi)
 Sami anthems, Sami anthems in various Sami languages
 , The Internationale in Northern Sami
  An extensive intro to Saami languages and grammar from How To Learn Any Language
 Sámi Dieđalaš Áigečála, the only peer-reviewed journal in Saami languages

 
Languages of Finland
Languages of Norway
Languages of Russia
Languages of Sweden
L01